Laurence Frederick Devaynes Blair (1868–1925)  was an Anglican priest: a missionary bishop in South America in the first half of the twentieth century.
	
He was educated at Pembroke College, Cambridge  and  ordained in 1892. He was  Curate of Portman Chapel from 1892 to 1895 when he became Rector of  Chedgrave.
He was Chaplain at Bellary then an  Army Chaplain. He was with the  Church Parochial Mission Society, from 1906 to 1910 when he became Bishop of the Falkland Islands.

Notes

1868 births
Alumni of Pembroke College, Cambridge
Anglican bishops of the Falkland Islands
English Anglican missionaries
1925 deaths
Anglican missionaries in Argentina